"No Regrets" is a song by folk and blues singer/songwriter Tom Rush. It is the final song on his 1968 album The Circle Game and was released as a single in the UK in January 1968 and in the US in April. It peaked at number 57 on the UK BMRB Breakers, an official extension of the UK Singles Chart.

His 1968 composition has become an acknowledged standard, with numerous cover versions having been recorded, most notably by The Walker Brothers. In addition to his 1968 sparse acoustic recording of the song, Rush later recorded a more lush, orchestrated pop version for Columbia Records featuring Carly Simon on background vocals and a screaming electric guitar solo for his 1974 album Ladies Love Outlaws.

The Walker Brothers version

The Walker Brothers recorded and released "No Regrets" as their comeback single in 1975, their first since 1967's "Walking in the Rain" and eleventh overall.

The song was also used as the title of its parent album. The single was slightly different as it features a John Walker harmony vocal not present on the album version which in turn includes female backing singers absent from the single.

"No Regrets" was a major hit spending twelve weeks on the UK Singles Chart and peaking at #7 in February 1976 giving Rush belated Top Ten exposure as a songwriter in the UK. The single would prove to be the group's final taste of commercial success while together, as the parent album and subsequent Walker Brothers releases failed to find a wide audience. The B-side "Remember Me" was written by John Walker under the pseudonym A. Dayam.

Track listing

Chart positions

Midge Ure version

In May 1982, Scottish musician Midge Ure released a cover of the song as his debut solo single. "No Regrets" was also produced by Ure, who was "tired of doing it for others, so I decided to do it for myself" and was co-produced and engineered by John Hudson.

Background 
In 1976, Ure went on Top of the Pops as part of Slik with "Forever and Ever". At the same time, the Walker Brothers were also on with their version of "No Regrets". Ure said that "it just stuck in the back of my head" and after doing a favour for a studio engineer (presumably John Hudson), Ure was offered some studio time. So, he decided to record "No Regrets" based on what he remembered of the Walker Brothers' version. Ure also said that "it was dabbling with fire, I should not have gone anywhere near it". After the release of the single, Ure also thought about doing a solo album, but never found the time and it was not until 1985 that he released his album The Gift.

Reception 
Reviewing for Record Mirror, Simon Tebbutt described the song as "a brilliant mixture of the big emotional American ballad … with the kind of clean cut and almost cold European precision we've come to associate with Mr Ure."

Track listing

Personnel 
 Midge Ure – all instrumentation, producer
 John Hudson – co-producer (1), recording engineer (1)
 Brian Tench – co-producer (2), recording engineer (2)
 Jack Hunt – cutting engineer at Utopia Studios
 Peter Saville – design
 Trevor Key – photography

Charts

Collection of Versions 

On March 12, 2023, Patrick Bryant of WMBR 88.1 FM Cambridge played many versions of "No Regrets" on his "Subject to Change" show. A permanent archive of this two hour show may be found at this link.

References

1968 songs
1975 singles
The Walker Brothers songs
1982 debut singles
Midge Ure songs
Elektra Records singles